Hayden's Ferry Review is a literary magazine published biannually by Arizona State University (ASU). The magazine was established in 1986 and is headquartered in the Virginia G. Piper Center for Creative Writing at ASU. It also manages a blog with news, information, and reviews about current events in literature and publishing.

See also
 List of literary magazines

References

External links

Arizona State University
Biannual magazines published in the United States
Literary magazines published in the United States
Magazines established in 1986
Magazines published in Arizona
Mass media in Tempe, Arizona